The Leibniz Institute for Neurobiology (short LIN) is a German research institute of neuroscience in Magdeburg, focusing on learning, memory and neural plasticity. The institute was founded in 1992 and belongs to the Leibniz Association.

Notes and references

External links 
 

Neuroscience research centers in Germany
Leibniz Association
1992 establishments in Germany
1985 establishments in East Germany